The Danish Immigration Service ( or Udlændingeservice)  is a directorate within the Danish Ministry of Refugees, Immigration and Integration Affairs.
The service administrates the Danish Aliens Act, in other words, it handles applications for asylum, family reunification, visas, work permits, etc. In addition, the service is engaged in a wide range of other duties relating to the asylum and immigration area, including the task of accommodating asylum seekers.

There have been disagreements between the Danish Immigration Service and Minister for Integration Søren Pind over the requirements for family reunification for immigrants.

In October 2017 the Danish migration agency Udlændingestyrelsen rejected over 600 asylum applications because the applicants had lied about their national identity in order to achieve preferential treatment.

References

External links
 Danish Immigration Service
 Denmark Immigration and Visa Consultants

Immigration Service
Immigration to Denmark